Rover is the third extended play by South Korean singer Kai, released on March 13, 2023, by SM Entertainment. The EP contains six tracks including the lead single of the same name. The physical album is available in five versions (two "Photobook" versions, one "Sleeve" version, one "Digipack" version, and one "SMini" version).

Background and release
In February 2023, SM confirmed that Kai plans to release a new solo album. On February 17, SM announced that his new EP, Rover, would be released on March 13.

The music video for "Rover" was inspired by two movies: Billy Elliot (2000) and Catch Me If You Can (2002).

Composition
The lead single "Rover" is a dancehall song featuring heavy bass, marimba, bells and various percussions. The lyrics sing of throwing off the restraints of others' viewpoints and living freely as a 'wanderer'. "Black Mirror" is an R&B hip hop song with lyrics that question the lifestyle of modern humans reliant on the stimulating, provocative content on social media. "Bomba" is a dance genre song with reggaeton beats. "Slidin'" is an R&B soul genre song that features elegant arpeggio synth sounds and rhythmical drums. The lyrics compare falling in love at first sight with someone that you run into by chance to one's clothes becoming wet from a sudden downpour. "Say You Love Me" is a hip-hop R&B song accompanied by drums and 808 bass. The lyrics make use of candid, straightforward expressions to depict one's desire for the other to confirm their interest in an honest manner. "Sinner" is a pop genre song with piano and synthesizer as accompaniments. The lyrics express the desire to remain trapped in an exhausting type of love where both exhilaration and pain coexist.

Track listing

Credits
Credits adapted from EP's liner notes.

Studio

 SM Starlight Studio – recording , mixing , engineered for mix , digital editing 
 SM Yellow Tail Studio – recording , digital editing, engineered for mix 
 SM Big Shot Studio – recording , mixing , engineered for mix , digital editing 
 Doobdoob Studio – recording, digital editing 
 Sound Pool Studio – recording 
 Embassy Studio – recording 
 SM Blue Ocean Studio – mixing 
 SM Blue Cup Studio – mixing 
 SM Lvyin Studio – mixing, engineered for mix 
 SM Ssam Studio – engineered for mix 
 SM Concert Hall Studio – mixing 
 821 Sound Mastering – mastering

Personnel

 SM Entertainment – executive producer
 Lee Sung-soo – production director, executive supervisor
 Tak Young-jun – executive supervisor
 Yoo Young-jin – music and sound supervisor
 Kai – vocals , background vocals 
 Park Tae-won – lyrics 
 Mia (153/Joombas) – lyrics 
 Lee Yeon-ji (PNP) – lyrics 
 RGB (Lalala Studio) – lyrics 
 Kim Su-min (Artiffect) – lyrics 
 Danke (Lalala Studio) – lyrics 
 Hwang Yu-bin (Verygoods) – lyrics 
 Cristian Tarcea – composition, arrangement 
 Dara – composition 
 Valentina Nikova – composition 
 YNGA – composition 
 Young Chance – composition , vocal directing , background vocals 
 Gabriel Brandes – composition 
 Imlay – arrangement 
 John "Jbl8ze" Eley – composition, arrangement 
 Jordan Dollar – composition, arrangement 
 Castle – composition, arrangement 
 Talay Riley – composition, arrangement 
 Steve "Tave" Octave – composition 
 Sam Klempner – composition, arrangement 
 Michael Matosic – composition 
 Jake Torrey – composition 
 Vinny "Vinnyforgood" Verdi – composition, arrangement 
 Michael "Trupopgod" Jiminez – composition, arrangement 
 Miguel Jiminez – composition 
 Dominique Logan – composition 
 Darius Logan – composition 
 Koen van de Wardtcomposition, arrangement 
 Ruben Pol – composition, arrangement 
 Chancellor – vocal directing , background vocals, recording 
 Rick Bridges – vocal directing 
 Kim Yeon-seo – vocal directing 
 Bob Matthews – keyboard 
 Jeong Yu-ra – recording , mixing , engineered for mix , digital editing 
 Noh Min-ji – recording , digital editing, engineered for mix 
 Lee Min-gyu – recording , mixing , engineered for mix , digital editing 
 Eugene Kwon – recording, digital editing 
 Jung Ho-jin – recording 
 Kim Cheol-sun – mixing 
 Jung Eui-seok – mixing 
 Lee Ji-hong – mixing, engineered for mix 
 Kang Eun-ji – engineered for mix 
 Nam Koong-jin – mixing 
 Lee Yong-jin – digital editing 
 Woo Min-jeong – digital editing 
 Kwon Nam-woo – mastering

Release history

References

2023 EPs
Kai (entertainer, born 1994) EPs
Korean-language EPs
SM Entertainment EPs